José Antonio de Santiago-Juárez (born 18 November 1951) is a Spanish politician and Psychologist. He is a member of the People's Party of Castile and León, and was the ministry of the presidency of the Junta of Castile and León from 2015 to 2019. He is the current Councilor of the Valladolid, in office from 15 June 2015. He was elected for the first time, to the Councilor of the Valladolid. He was elected procurator of the Cortes of Castile and León from 2011 to 2015, who was re-elected to the current Councilor of the Valladolid, in office from 22 June 2015. He was president of the electoral committee of the popular party of castile and león from 2012 to 2015.

Biography
José Antonio was born in Valladolid, Spain. He married Concha and has a daughter named Paula. His father Antolín de Santiago was also a politician. He ‍was acquired his degree in medicine and surgery from University of Valladolid. He served as vice president of the Junta of Castile and León from 2016 to 2019. He was a member of the national board of directors of the popular party from 2008 to 2015. He became president of the national research institute for medicine under the ministry of home affairs. He earned a degree in specialty of psychiatry.

References 

1951 births
Living people
People from Valladolid
20th-century Spanish politicians
21st-century Spanish politicians
People's Party (Spain) politicians